Despite the field diversity, all structural analog analysis use some level of abstraction to transform models in mathematical graphs, and detected structural analogies by algorithms. Example: for molecular structure comparison and classification operations, the compared compounds are modeled as a mathematical graph.

Analogical models are used in a method of representing a ‘target system’ by another, more understandable or analysable system.

Two systems have analog structures (see illustration) if they  are isomorphic graphs and have equivalent (mapped) lumped elements. In electronics, methods based on fault models of structural analogs gain some acceptance in industry.

References

Electronics